Ingrid of Sweden (English exonym: Ingrith) may refer to:

Ingrid Ragnvaldsdotter, Swedish princess 12th century
Saint Ingrid of Sweden 
Ingrid, Swedish princess around 1205, daughter of King Sweartgar II, abbess
Ingrid Ylva, Swedish princess or noblewoman (disputed), 13th century
Ingrid of Sweden, Princess of Sweden 1910